is a special ward located in Tokyo Metropolis, Japan. The English translation of its Japanese self-designation is City of Kita. The ward was founded on March 15, 1947.

As of May 1, 2015, the ward has an estimated population of 340,287, and a population density of 16,510 persons per km2. The total area is 20.61 km2.

Districts and neighborhoods

Akabane-Iwabuchi Area
 Akabane
 
 
 
 
 
 
 
 
 
 

Ōji Area
 
 
 
 
 
 
 
 
 
 

Takinogawa Area

History
The area was a collection of rural villages and towns until the 1880s, when it was connected by rail to central Tokyo (Oji Station opening in 1883). Parts of the area joined Tokyo City in 1932 as the Ōji (former Ōji and Iwabuchi towns) and Takinogawa (former Takinogawa town) Wards. Kita was officially formed in 1947 by the merger of these wards.

Geography
The name Kita, meaning "north," reflects the location among the wards of Tokyo. To its north lie the cities of Kawaguchi and Toda in Saitama Prefecture. To the east, south and west lie other special wards: Adachi, Arakawa, Itabashi, Bunkyō, and Toshima.

Four rivers run through Kita: 
Arakawa River 
Sumida River
Shakujii River
Shingashi River

Famous sites
 Asukayama Park
 Ukima Park
 Chūō Park (formerly Camp Oji)
 Kyu-Furukawa Gardens, designated a National Place of Scenic Beauty.
 Nanushi-no-taki Park
 Oji Inari shrine

Economy
The head office of Seiyu Group is in Kita.

Education

The city's public elementary and middle schools are operated by the City of Kita Board of Education.

The city's public high schools are operated by the Tokyo Metropolitan Government Board of Education.
  (東京都立飛鳥高等学校)
  (東京都立赤羽商業高等学校)
  (東京都立桐ケ丘高等学校)
  (東京都立王子総合高等学校)

The following private domestic schools are in the ward:
 Seigakuin Junior & Senior High School (for boys) – 
 Joshi Seigakuin Junior & Senior High School (for girls) – Nakazato

The following international schools are in the ward:
Lycée Français International de Tokyo (French)
  (French-English)
Tokyo Korean Junior and Senior High School (North Korean)

The following universities are in the ward:
 Tokyo University of Social Welfare
 Tokyo Seitoku University

Transportation

Rail
JR East
Tōhoku Main Line, Takasaki Line, Utsunomiya Line: Oku, Akabane Stations
Saikyō Line (Akabane Line): Itabashi, Jujo, Akabane, Kita Akabane, Ukima Funado Stations
Keihin-Tōhoku Line: Tabata, Kami Nakazato, Ōji, Higashi Jujo, Akabane Stations
Yamanote Line: Tabata Station
Tokyo Metropolitan Bureau of Transportation Tokyo Sakura Tram: Nishigahara-yonchome, Takinogawa-ichome, Asukayama, Oji-ekimae, Sakaecho, Kajiwara Stations
Tokyo Metro Namboku Line: Nishigahara, Ōji, Ōji Kamiya, Shimo, Akabane Iwabuchi Stations
Saitama Rapid Railway Line (Sainokuni Stadium Line): Akabane-Iwabuchi Station

Highways
Shuto Expressway C2 Central Loop (Itabashi JCT – Kasai JCT)
Route 17 (Nakasendō)

Notable people from Kita
Kōbō Abe, Japanese writer, playwright, musician, photographer, inventor and novelist
Elephant Kashimashi, rock band
Kyoko Fukada, model, actress, and singer
Megumi Hayashibara, seiyuu, musician, singer, writer, radio DJ and TV talk show host, certified nurse
Hikaru Ijuin, radio and television personality
Kiyoshi Kodama, actor and TV personality
Kazuya Yoshii, singer-songwriter and musician (The Yellow Monkey)
KOHH, rapper (Real Name: Yuki Chiba, Nihongo: 千葉雄喜, Chiba Yūki)
Yuichi Nakamaru, singer-songwriter, actor, television personality, radio host, and a member of KAT-TUN

International relations
Kita has a sister city relationship with Xuanwu District, Beijing, China.

It is also twinned with the following cities in Japan.
Sakata, Yamagata
Kanra, Gunma
Nakanojō, Gunma

See also

References

External links

Kita City Official Website 

 
Wards of Tokyo